The Monterey County Herald, sometimes referred to as the Monterey Herald, is a daily newspaper published in Monterey, California that serves Monterey County.

In December, 2013, the Herald's parent company Media News Group merged to become Digital First Media. In the year to come, the paper underwent a "reorganization plan" which included a redesign of both the newspaper and website, the move of newspaper production out-of-area, as well as a change in editor.

History
The Monterey County Herald, with offices in downtown Monterey, California, was produced at Ryan Ranch on the Monterey Peninsula from 1990–2014.  It previously appeared as The Monterey Peninsula Herald, with editorial offices on Pacific Street in Monterey, California.

The newspaper was founded and long published by Colonel Allen Griffin, and its long-time editor-in-chief was Edward Kennedy. Kennedy, as an Associated Press correspondent, had won celebrity, and considerable criticism, in the closing days of World War II by announcing Germany's surrender one day before that announcement was supposed to have been made. A small monument in Monterey memorializes him for having given the world an extra day of peace.

In 1967, the newspaper was bought by Block Communications.

In 1992 the paper was acquired by the E.W. Scripps Company in exchange for the Pittsburgh Press, which Block merged into its own Pittsburgh Post-Gazette. Scripps traded the paper, along with The (San Luis Obispo) Tribune, to Knight Ridder in 1997, in exchange for the Boulder Daily Camera.

Knight Ridder was later purchased by the Sacramento-based McClatchy Company in June 2006 in a deal valued at $4.5 billion. The deal was contingent on McClatchy selling off 12 of the 32 newspapers it had just purchased, including The Monterey County Herald .

On April 26, 2006, it was announced that MediaNews Group, headed by William Dean Singleton, would purchase four of the "orphan 12," including the Herald, the Contra Costa Times and San Jose Mercury News, for $1 billion.

In December 2013, MediaNews Group and 21st Century Media merged to create a new company operating under the name of its parent company, Digital First Media.

In 2013, the Santa Cruz Sentinel joined the same community newspaper division for Digital First Media as the Monterey Herald.  The two newspapers now share a common publisher, advertising director and circulation director.

In August 2014, The Monterey Herald moved from its 24-year location in Ryan Ranch to a renovated headquarters on Garden Road in Monterey.

See also
Ed Ricketts

Notes

External links
The Monterey County Heraldmonterey

Daily newspapers published in California
MediaNews Group publications
Mass media in Monterey County, California
Companies based in Monterey County, California
Digital First Media